is a seinen manga series written and illustrated by Takehiko Itō and his affiliated Morning Star Studio. The series is a science fiction Space Western that takes place in the "Toward Stars Era" universe in which spacecraft are capable of traveling faster than the speed of light. The plot follows protagonist Gene Starwind and his motley crew of an inherited ship dubbed the "Outlaw Star", as they search for a legendary, outer space treasure trove called the "Galactic Leyline".

The manga was serialized in the monthly Japanese Shueisha magazine Ultra Jump between 1996 and 1999. A total of 21 chapters were published, and 17 of these chapters were compiled among three tankōbon (collected volumes), released between August 1997 and January 1999. Each volume also contains information on the series' universe; detailed spaceship and planet descriptions; and character profiles. A Chinese version of the manga was published in Hong Kong by Sharp Point Press. The series has also been published in German and Italian by Planet Manga. No official English translation of the Outlaw Star exists, though Morning Star Studio's official website suggests that a release in the United States was planned at one time.



Volume list

Not released in tankōbon format
18. "Intermission"
19. "Intermission II"
20. "Sacred Ground"
21. "Chaser"

References

External links
Outlaw Star at Ultra Jump 

Outlaw Star
Outlaw Star